USV Eschen/Mauren is a Liechtensteiner football club from Eschen and Mauren.

They play at the Sportpark Eschen-Mauren, which used to be the national football stadium, until the Rheinpark Stadion in Vaduz was built. USV Eschen/Mauren, like all other Liechtensteiner teams, play in the Swiss Football League system.  The first team plays in 1. Liga, Group 3, the fourth tier of the Swiss Football League, following promotion in the 2007/08 season from 2.Liga interregional as a result of winning the Group 5 division.

The club was originally formed in 1963 as a merger of FC Mauren and FC Eschen. Since 1975, the first team has always played in Liga 2 except for the 1999/2000 season when they were promoted to 1. Liga, Group 3 before being relegated back again to 2.Liga interregional.  After the 2007/08 season, it won promotion once again.

USV has won the Liechtensteiner Cup on five occasions, the most recent being in 2012, and 17 occasions have been runners-up.

Honours
Liechtenstein Football Cup
Winners (5): 1976, 1977, 1978, 1987, 2012
Runners-up (17): 1979, 1982, 1983, 1985, 1988, 1989, 1990, 1995, 1996, 1998, 2002, 2005, 2009, 2010, 2011, 2014, 2017

European record

Current squad

Out on loan

Notes

External links
Official website 

 
Football clubs in Liechtenstein
Expatriated football clubs
1963 establishments in Liechtenstein